The Black Church is the body of Christian congregations and denominations that minister predominantly or exclusively to African Americans.

 Biserica Neagră, a church in Brașov, Romania
 St Mary's, Dublin (chapel of ease), a former chapel of ease in Ireland